Power Up (shortened as PWR/UP and stylised as PWRϟUP) is the seventeenth studio album by Australian rock band AC/DC, released on 13 November 2020 through Columbia Records and Sony Music Australia. Power Up marks the return of vocalist Brian Johnson, drummer Phil Rudd and bassist Cliff Williams, all of whom left AC/DC before, during, and after the supporting tour for their previous album Rock or Bust (2014). This is also the band's first album since the death of co-founder and rhythm guitarist Malcolm Young in 2017 and it serves as a tribute to him, according to his brother Angus. The album was generally well received by music critics and reached number one in 21 countries. It sold 1.4 million copies worldwide.

At the 2021 ARIA Music Awards, the album was nominated for Best Rock Album and the band were nominated for Best Group.

At the 2021 iHeartRadio Music Awards, the album won Rock Album of the Year. The single "Shot in the Dark" was nominated for Rock Song of the Year, but lost to Foo Fighters' "Shame Shame".

For the 64th Grammy Awards, the album was nominated for Best Rock Album, and "Shot In The Dark" was nominated for Best Rock Performance and Best Music Video.

Background and recording
Following the 2014 album Rock or Bust, the group embarked on a seventeen-month world tour. Prior to the tour, drummer Phil Rudd was charged with attempting to procure murder, threatening to kill, and possession of methamphetamine and cannabis. For the tour, Rudd was replaced by Chris Slade, who had also previously played with AC/DC on their 1990 album The Razors Edge, several years after Rudd first left the band. By 2016, lead singer Brian Johnson had started to suffer hearing loss, causing the final ten dates of the Rock or Bust tour to be rescheduled. Ultimately, he was replaced with Guns N' Roses vocalist Axl Rose for the remaining dates. On 8 July 2016, bassist Cliff Williams announced that he would be retiring from the band once the tour was finished, citing health issues as reasons for retiring, and calling AC/DC a "changed animal".

In 2018, rumours began circulating that AC/DC were working on their seventeenth studio album, with Johnson, Rudd, and Williams having returned to the group. Johnson, Rudd, Angus Young and Stevie Young were photographed in August 2018 at Warehouse Studio, a recording studio in Vancouver, British Columbia, Canada owned by fellow musician Bryan Adams, suggesting the band were working where they had recorded their three previous albums. The rumors were later confirmed as the truth, with the album having been recorded there over a six-week period in August and September 2018 with producer Brendan O'Brien, who also oversaw 2008's Black Ice and 2014's Rock or Bust, with some tweaking having followed in early 2019. Every track is credited to Angus and Malcolm Young as Angus had raided the AC/DC vault of unreleased songs to record the album.

Promotion and release
After a series of cryptic teases reading PWR/UP (stylised as PWRϟUP) on the band's website, the album's title was revealed to be Power Up on 7 October 2020.

Also after a series of teasers in the days prior, the music audio for the band's first single, "Shot in the Dark", was released the same day. A music video for the song was released on 26 October 2020. The song topped the Billboard Mainstream Rock Songs chart for two weeks starting in November 2020. A (53-second) short clip of a second song, "Demon Fire", was debuted ahead of the album's release on 30 October 2020 as well and was released once again on 8 December 2020, the day before the complete song's world premiere release.

The music audio for the album's second single, "Realize", was released on 11 November 2020.

The album was released on 13 November 2020. In its first week of release, it was projected to place either first or second on the Billboard 200 all-format albums chart, and to top the US and UK album sales chart.

On 7 December 2020, it was announced that the music video for "Demon Fire" would have its world premiere release on 9 December 2020 as the third single from the album.

A music video for the song "Realize" was released via YouTube on 13 January 2021.

A music video for the song "Witch's Spell" was released via YouTube on 9 June 2021.

A music video for the song “Through the Mists of Time” was released via YouTube on 30 September 2021.

Critical reception

At Metacritic, which assigns a normalised rating out of 100 to reviews from professional publications, the release received an average score of 79, based on 19 reviews, indicating "Generally favourable reviews". Aggregator AnyDecentMusic? gave the album a 7.2 out of 10, based on their assessment of the critical consensus.

AllMusic review by Stephen Thomas Erlewine stated, "Good times have always been a crucial part of the band, but there's a depth of feeling to the levity on Power Up, as if the band decided that the best way to pay respect to what they've lost is by focusing on what they still have. They don't dwell upon the past, they barrel forward with a set of turbocharged blues and high-octane rock that doesn't merely sound good, it feels nourishing." Daniel Sylvester of Exclaim! noted, "The fact that AC/DC came together to create something as satisfying as Power Up when the cards were down is a complete miracle upon itself, and AC/DC seem more than ready to celebrate." Kitty Empire of The Guardian gave the album three stars out of five, stating, "If deja vu is a familiar sensation with AC/DC, few outfits have managed to eke so much variety out of so few constituent parts as these stalwarts of reductio ad absurdum. For the undiminished certainties AC/DC provide in the face of adversity, it's hard not to salute them." Nick Ruskell of Kerrang! observed, "AC/DC have made an album that, even for them, is a high-voltage celebration of life, the best of times, and the absolutely indomitable, boundless power of a couple of chords and a four-four beat. In a time where getting together with your mates and partying and getting the beers in and shagging and living it up is all but illegal, as a reminder of just how powerful and timeless the very idea of these wonderful things are, AC/DC have never felt more necessary or vital."

Accolades

Commercial performance
In Australia, Power Up debuted at number one on the ARIA Charts and, in the process, AC/DC became the first act to have an Australian number one album in five consecutive decades (1980s to 2020s). The album registered 21,535 sales in its first week outselling the rest of the top 15 combined. As of 12 December, it has spent four weeks at number one, becoming the equal longest number 1 album in Australia in 2020.

In the United States, Power Up debuted at number one on the Billboard 200 chart, with 117,000 album-equivalent units (including 111,000 pure sales) in its opening week. It became the band's third album to reach number one on the chart, following For Those About to Rock We Salute You (1981) and Black Ice (2008). Additionally, the album's tracks accumulated a total 7.8 million on-demand streams in the week ending 28 November.

The album debuted at number one on the UK Albums Chart on 13 November 2020 with 62,000 chart sales, displacing Kylie Minogue's Disco as biggest opening week release of 2020 so far.

In Germany, it debuted at number one, selling almost 160,000 copies, the best start of the year. It stayed at number one for a total of 5 non-consecutive weeks, and became the best selling album of 2020.

Worldwide, it was the 6th best selling album of 2020 with 1.37 million copies sold.

Track listing
All tracks are written by Angus Young and Malcolm Young.

Personnel
Credits for Power Up adapted from liner notes.

AC/DC
Brian Johnson – lead vocals
Angus Young – lead guitar
Stevie Young – rhythm guitar, backing vocals
Cliff Williams – bass guitar, backing vocals
Phil Rudd – drums

Additional personnel
Mike Fraser – engineering, mixing
Brendan O'Brien – production, mixing
Ryan Smith – mastering
Billy Bowers – additional engineering
Zach Blackstone – assistant engineering
Dominick Civiero – assistant engineering 
Richard Jones – equipment technician
Trace Foster – equipment technician
Simon Murton – equipment technician
Josh Cheuse – creative direction and photography, art direction and design
Michelle Holme – art direction and design
Ben Ib – cover art

Charts

Weekly charts

Year-end charts

Certifications and sales

References

External links

2020 albums
AC/DC albums
Columbia Records albums
Sony Music Australia albums
Albums postponed due to the COVID-19 pandemic
Albums produced by Brendan O'Brien (record producer)
Albums recorded at The Warehouse Studio
Albums in memory of deceased persons